Speckled Bird may refer to:

A Speckled Bird, novel by Augusta Jane Evans published in 1902 
Speckled Bird (album), The Choir album
The Speckled Bird, a semi-autobiographical novel by William Butler Yeats, written in four versions and published posthumously by William H. O'donnell in 1976 and 2003

See also
The Great Speckled Bird (disambiguation)
 "The Great Speckled Bird" (song), a southern hymn
 The Great Speckled Bird (newspaper), an Atlanta underground newspaper
 Great Speckled Bird (band), a Canadian country-rock group
 Great Speckled Bird (album), their eponymous album